José Rivaldo Lozano Silva (born 5 October 1998) is a Mexican professional footballer who plays as a full-back for Liga MX club Santos Laguna.

Career statistics

Club

References

External links
 
 
 

Living people
1998 births
Mexican footballers
Association football defenders
Ascenso MX players
Atlas F.C. footballers
Atlético San Luis footballers
Liga MX players
Tampico Madero F.C. footballers
Footballers from Guadalajara, Jalisco
Liga de Expansión MX players